Plesiocetus is a genus of extinct balaenopterids found worldwide. It has had a chequered taxonomic history, having served as a wastebasket genus for a handful of mysticete species.

Taxonomy 
The genus Plesiocetus was originally coined for three mysticete species from Neogene marine deposits in the vicinity of Antwerp, Belgium: P. garopii, P. hupschii, and P. burtinii.

The three originally included species of Plesiocetus went about their separate ways. P. garopii was designated the type species of the genus, while the other two were referred to Cetotherium.(P. hupschii and P. burtinii were later assigned to Plesiocetopsis, which was originally erected as a subgenus of Cetotherium) Later, van Beneden noted the similarities of Plesiocetus with the fin whale, so he renamed Plesiocetus garopii into Balaenoptera musculoides, which is invalid under current ICZN rules. At the same time, he also erected the new species P. brialmontii on the basis of fragmentary remains, while referring Cetotherium dubius to Plesiocetus.

The taxonomy of Plesiocetus by now was confused. Plesiocetus garopii was referred to Balaenoptera (making Plesiocetus a synonym of Balaenoptera), while P. hupschii and P. burtinii were assigned to Cetotherium. To avoid nomenclatorial complications, Plesiocetus hupschii was designated the type species of Plesiocetopsis, removing any synonymy between Plesiocetus and Plesiocetopsis. Recent studies, however, indicate that Plesiocetus shares no characters with Balaenoptera to the exclusion of other balaenopterids. For its part, P. burtinii was referred to Aglaocetus, while P. brialmontii was declared a nomen dubium. These revisions leave P. garopii the type and only species of Plesiocetus.

Distribution 
Fossils of Plesiocetus have been found in:

Neogene
 Gaimán Formation, Argentina
 Berchem, Diest and Sables d'Anvers Formations, Belgium
 Navidad Formation, Chile
 Mont-de-Marsan and Poussan, France
 Eibergen Member, Netherlands

Quaternary
 Red Crag Formation, United Kingdom

References 

Baleen whales
Prehistoric cetacean genera
Miocene cetaceans
Pliocene cetaceans
Pleistocene cetaceans
Miocene mammals of Europe
Pliocene mammals of Europe
Pleistocene mammals of Europe
Neogene United Kingdom
Fossils of Belgium
Fossils of Denmark
Fossils of France
Fossils of Germany
Fossils of Italy
Fossils of the Netherlands
Fossils of England
Miocene mammals of North America
Pliocene mammals of North America
Neogene Mexico
Fossils of Mexico
Neogene United States
Fossils of North Carolina
Miocene mammals of South America
Neogene Argentina
Fossils of Argentina
Gaiman Formation
Neogene Chile
Fossils of Chile
Fossil taxa described in 1859